Year 382 (CCCLXXXII) was a common year starting on Saturday (link will display the full calendar) of the Julian calendar. At the time, it was known as the Year of the Consulship of Antonius and Syagrius (or, less frequently, year 1135 Ab urbe condita). The denomination 382 for this year has been used since the early medieval period, when the Anno Domini calendar era became the prevalent method in Europe for naming years.

Events 
 By place 
 Roman Empire 
 October 3 – Emperor Theodosius I commands his general Saturninus to conclude a peace treaty with the Visigoths, allowing them to settle south of the Danube. They are installed as foederati in Moesia and Thrace with the title of "Allies of the Roman People", in exchange for furnishing a contingent of auxiliary troops to defend the borders.
 Emperor Gratian refuses the divine attributes of the Imperial cult and removes the Altar of Victory from the Senate.

 By topic 
 Religion 
 The Council of Rome establishes Biblical canon in the Catholic Church. Pope Damasus I commissions a revision of the Vetus Latina, eventually resulting in the Vulgate of Jerome.
 The same council adopts Trinitarianism as doctrine, condemning Apollinarism. Theodosius I orders the death of members of the Manichaean monks.
 The first sermons declaring the virginity of Mary are given by John Chrysostom.

Births 
 Jin Andi, emperor of the Eastern Jin Dynasty (d. 419)
 Sima Yuanxian, regent during the Jin Dynasty (d. 402)

Deaths 
 Apollinaris the Younger, bishop of Laodicea in Syria

References